Yeshiva Pri Eitz Chaim was a Chareidi (Litvishe) Yeshiva based in Johannesburg, South Africa. The Yeshiva was established in 2004 by Rabbi Adam Saffer together with Rosh Yeshiva  Rabbi Rabbi Eichenstein and operated for three years, and was located in Kollel Yad Shaul in Gardens, Johannesburg. Rabbi Eichestein was joined in 2007 by Rabbi Gedalya Sternstein. Rabbi Eichenstein delivered weekly lectures to the public, as well as to high school students, in addition to his Yeshiva duties.

See also
Jewish education in South Africa
Orthodox yeshivas in South Africa

Ashkenazi Jewish culture in South Africa
Education in Johannesburg
Jews and Judaism in Johannesburg
Lithuanian-Jewish diaspora
Lithuanian South African
Orthodox yeshivas in South Africa